In abstract algebra, Krull's separation lemma is a lemma in ring theory. It was proved by Wolfgang Krull in 1928.

Statement of the lemma
Let  be an ideal and let  be a multiplicative system (i.e.  is closed under multiplication) in a ring , and suppose 
.

References

Theorems in ring theory
Lemmas